Jintar Simanjuntak (born 4 November 1987) is an Indonesian karateka. At the Southeast Asian Games he won the gold medal in the men's kumite 67 kg event both in 2011 and in 2013. He is also a bronze medalist at the 2018 Asian Games.

Career 
In 2018, he won one of the bronze medals in the men's kumite 67 kg event at the Asian Games held in Jakarta, Indonesia. His win at the Asian Games marked the end of his competitive sports career.

He also represented Indonesia at the 2010 Asian Games in Guangzhou, China and at the 2014 Asian Games in Incheon, South Korea without winning a medal. In 2010, he competed in the men's kumite 67 kg event and in 2014 he also competed in the men's kumite 67 kg event.

Achievements

References 

1987 births
Living people
Place of birth missing (living people)
Indonesian male karateka
Karateka at the 2010 Asian Games
Karateka at the 2014 Asian Games
Karateka at the 2018 Asian Games
Asian Games bronze medalists for Indonesia
Asian Games medalists in karate
Medalists at the 2018 Asian Games
Competitors at the 2009 Southeast Asian Games
Competitors at the 2011 Southeast Asian Games
Competitors at the 2013 Southeast Asian Games
Competitors at the 2017 Southeast Asian Games
Southeast Asian Games gold medalists for Indonesia
Southeast Asian Games silver medalists for Indonesia
Southeast Asian Games bronze medalists for Indonesia
Southeast Asian Games medalists in karate
21st-century Indonesian athletes